The 2019-20 Sacred Heart Pioneers men's ice hockey season was the 27th season of play for the program, the 22nd at the Division I level, and the 17th season in the Atlantic Hockey conference. The Pioneers represented Sacred Heart University and were coached by C. J. Marottolo, in his 11th season.

On March 12, 2020, Atlantic Hockey announced that the remainder of the conference tournament was cancelled due to the coronavirus pandemic.

Current roster
.

Standings

Schedule and Results

|-
!colspan=12 style=";" | Regular Season

|-
!colspan=12 style=";" | 

|-
!colspan=12 style=";" | 
|- align="center" bgcolor="#e0e0e0"
|colspan=12|Tournament Cancelled

Scoring Statistics

Goaltending statistics

Rankings

References

Sacred Heart Pioneers men's ice hockey seasons
Sacred Heart Pioneers
Sacred Heart Pioneers
2019 in sports in Connecticut
2020 in sports in Connecticut